The Holy Spirit (ruh al-qudus) is mentioned four times in the Quran, where it acts as an agent of divine action or communication. The Muslim interpretation of the Holy Spirit is generally consistent with other interpretations based upon the Old and the New Testaments. Further, the Quran refers to rūḥ as Ruh al-qudus ("the holy spirit" or "spirit of holiness") and ar-ruh al-amin ("the faithful/trustworthy spirit"). The holy spirit is more commonly known as archangel Gabriel (Arabic: جبريل‎, Jibrīl or جبرائيل‎, Jibrāʾīl), the messenger to all the prophets.

In Sufism, rūḥ (plural ) is a person's immortal, essential self—pneuma, i.e. the "spirit" or "soul". The Quran itself does not describe rūḥ as the immortal self, directly. Nevertheless, in some contexts, it animates inanimate matter. Further, it appears to be a metaphorical being, such as an angel. In one instance, rūḥ refers to Jesus.

Outside the Quran, rūḥ may also refer to a spirit that roams the earth; a ghost.

Among the al-Laṭaʾif as-sitta it is the third purity.

In the Quran 
Some Muslim commentators connected this expression with the "faithful/trustworthy spirit" (ar-ruh al-amin) who is said to have brought down the Quran in verse , and identified with Gabriel.

Other Muslim commentators viewed it as identical with the created spirit described in other Quranic verses as the means by which God brought Adam to life (e.g.), made Mary conceive Jesus  and inspired angels and prophets (e.g.). The spirit who together with "the angels" descends and ascends to God was also identified with Gabriel in Quranic commentaries. Thus, the figure of Gabriel became a focus of theological reflection on the content of revelation and the nature of cognition itself, with distinctions articulated between reason, prophetic revelation, and mystical knowledge.

Rūḥ al-qudus
Rūḥ al-qudus ("the holy spirit" or "spirit of holiness"), ar-rūḥ al-amin ("the faithful/trustworthy spirit"), is a Quranic expressions that describes a source or means of prophetic revelations, commonly identified with the angel Gabriel. Quranic commentators disagreed in their identification of Gabriel with various uses of the word rūḥ. For some, ar-rūḥ is simply the angelic quality bestowed upon humans, but not an angel himself.

In three instances, it is described as the means by which God "strengthened" Jesus, and in the fourth it is identified as the one brought down God's truth to his prophet.

As interpreted to refer to the Archangel Gabriel 
The term Rūḥ al-Qudus is also an epithet referring to the Archangel Gabriel, who is related as the Angel of revelation and was assigned by God to reveal the Qurʼan to the Islamic prophet Muhammad and who delivered the Annunciation to Mary.

In the two suras in which the Qur'an refers to the angel Gabriel, it does so by name. However, some hadiths and parts of the Qurʼan may arguably lend support to the alternative view.

It appears to be indicated by the Quran in sura Maryam, ayat 17–21, that it was the angel Gabriel who gave to Mary the tidings that she was to have a son as a virgin:

It is narrated in hadith that the angel Gabriel accompanied Muhammad during the Mi'raj, an ascension to the heavens in which Muhammad is said to have met other messengers of God and was instructed about the manner of Islamic prayer(). It is also held by Muslims that the angel Gabriel descends to Earth on the night of Laylat al-Qadr, a night in the last ten days of the holy month of Ramadan, which is said to be the night on which the Qurʼan was first revealed.

The Arabic phrase al-Qudus translates into English as "Holiness" or "Sanctity". al-Quddūs "the All-Holy" is one of the 99 Names of God in Islam.

In Shia Islam
In Shia Islam, rūḥ is described as "a creature (khalq) of God, grander than Gabriel or Michael", who was sent to inform and guide Muhammad and is now with the Imams. In some Shia traditions, ruh al-qudus (spirit of holiness) is one of the five spirits possessed by the Imam. Unlike the other four spirits, it is always vigilant and available to inform the Imam on any issue. There is disagreement on whether ruh is an angel.

As soul 
God is believed to endow humans with rūḥ  and nafs , (i.e. ego or psyche). The rūḥ "drives" the nafs, which comprises temporal desires and sensory perceptions. The nafs can assume control of the body if the rūḥ surrenders to bodily urges. The nafs is subject to bodily desire within the sadr (the chest), whereas the rūḥ is a person's immaterial essence, beyond the emotions and instincts shared by humans and other animals; rūḥ makes the body alive. Some   (spirits) dwell in the seventh heaven. Unlike the angels, they are supposed to eat and drink. An angel called ar-Rūḥ (the Spirit) is responsible for them.

Muslim authors, like Ghazali, Ibn Qayyim and Suyuti wrote in more details about the life of ghosts. Ibn Qayyim and Suyuti assert, when a soul desires to turn back to earth long enough, it is gradually released from restrictions of Barzakh and able to move freely. Each spirit experiences afterlife in accordance with their deeds and convictions in the earthly life. Evil souls will find the afterlife painful by receiving punishment, and imprisoned until God allows them to interact with other souls. However, good souls are not restricted. They are free to come visit other souls and even come down to lower regions. The higher planes are considered to be broader than the lower ones, the lowest being the most narrow. The spiritual space is not thought as spatial, but reflects the capacity of the spirit. The more pure the spirit gets, the more it is able to interact with other souls and thus reaches a broader degree of freedom.

Perfection of the Rūh through the Awakening of the Lataif-e-sitta (organs of spiritual perception)

To attain Tajalli ar-rūḥ, (the ultimate manifestation of divine truth in the human soul) the Salik (Sufi aspirant), must cultivate the following 13 spiritual qualities or virtuous practices, thus facilitating the gradual awakening in order of the various centres or subtle plexuses of his/her jism latif (subtle body).

Irādah or Commitment to God
Istiqāmah or Steadfastness in the way with God
Hāya or Shame in committing evil
Ḥurīyyah or Freedom:  Ibrahim Bin Adham said, "A free man is one who abandons the world before he leaves the world".  Yaḥyā Bin Maz said, "Those who serve the people of the world are slaves, and those who serve the people of Ākhirah are the free ones".  Abū ʿAlī Daqāq said, "Remember, real freedom is in total obedience.  Therefore if someone has total obedience in God, he will be free from the slavery of non God"
Fatoot or Manliness: Abū ʿAlī Daqāq said, "Manliness is in one's being of continuous service to others.  This is a form of etiquette that was perfected by the Prophet Muhammad alone".
Ḥub or Love for God
Aboodiyah or Slavery under God
Muraqaba or Complete Focus on God
Duʿāʾ or Prayer
Faqar or Abandoning of materialism
Tasawwuf or Wearing a dress of no material significance
Suhbat or Company of the righteous ones
Adab or Following Protocols of respect for the great ones

See also

 Islamic philosophy
 Qalb
 Sufi philosophy
 Taqwa
 Ruha (Mandaic cognate)

References

External links
 Quran 2:253 with a recitation and various translations

Archangels in Islam
Arabic words and phrases
Islam
Islamic terminology
Islamic belief and doctrine
Sufi philosophy